The 1920 United States Senate election in Maryland was held on November 2, 1920. Incumbent Democratic U.S. Senator John Walter Smith ran for re-election to a third term in office, but was beaten by Republican Ovington Weller.

General election

Candidates
William Ashbie Hawkins (Independent)
George D. Iverson Jr., Democratic Delegate from Baltimore City (Independent)
Frank N.H. Lang (Labor)
John Walter Smith, incumbent Senator since 1908 (Democratic)
William A. Toole (Socialist)
Ovington Weller, Treasurer of the National Republican Senatorial Committee and nominee for Governor in 1915 (Republican)

Results

See also 
 1920 United States Senate elections

References 

Maryland
1920
United States Senate